= Kerry Rupp (businesswoman) =

American businesswoman (born 1971)

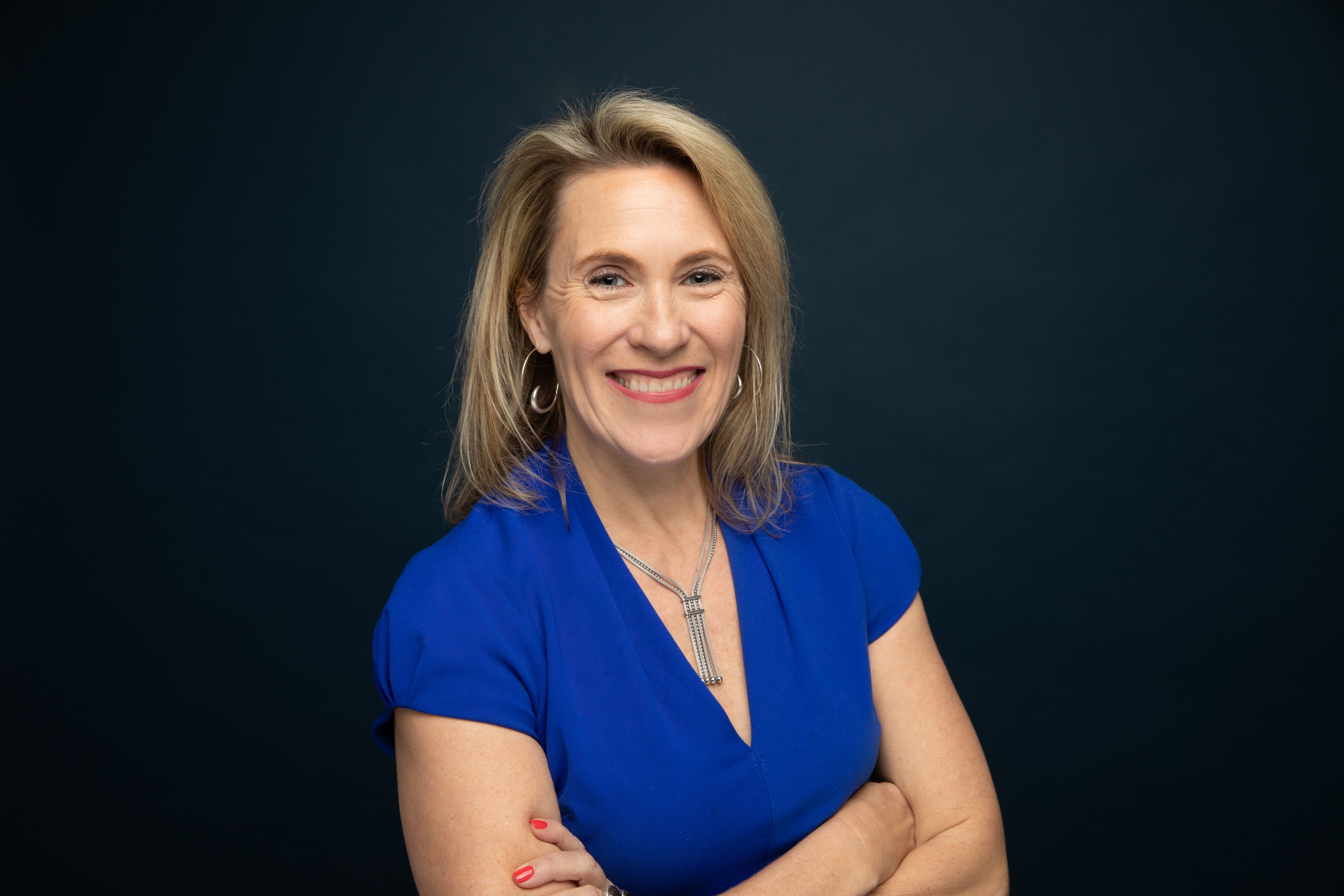
- Born: 1971 (age 54–55); Boston
- Education: Duke University; Harvard Business School
- Occupation: Businesswoman

Kerry Rupp is an American businesswoman. She has previously served as a chief executive officer of DreamIt.

Rupp invests in women-led startups related to health and the environment through her firm.

She also serves as a director of Texas 4000 for Cancer.

== Early life ==
Born in 1971 in Boston, Rupp received her early education from a high school in the Chicago area.

She holds a bachelor's degree in biology from Duke University. In 1999, she graduated with a master's in business administration degree from Harvard Business School.

== Career ==
In 2010, Rupp became part of DreamIt and later served its chief executive officer till 2015. She has also worked as a faculty member for the National Science Foundation.

In 2016, she joined True Wealth Ventures which invests in women-led startups, where she serves as a general partner.

She was also the founder of Holiday Golightly, a travel agency.
